The  was an army of the Imperial Japanese Army during the Second Sino-Japanese War.

History
The Japanese 20th Army was formed on September 10, 1941 under the Kwantung Army in Heilongjiang province in northern Manchukuo as a garrison and border patrol force. It came under the administrative control of the Japanese First Area Army on July 4, 1942. On October 19, 1944, it was transferred to central China and came under the command of the Japanese Sixth Area Army to provide a garrison force for areas left under defended by the movement of troops further south in Operation Ichi-Go. From April 9, 1945 - June 7, 1945 it carried out the offensive in the Battle of West Hunan, the last major Japanese offensive of the Second Sino-Japanese War, during which time it suffered significant casualties.  After the surrender of Japan, the 20th Army came under control of the Kuomintang government of the Republic of China and was assigned to the maintenance of public order until it was officially disbanded on July 15, 1946 at Hengyang, Hunan province.

Historical controversy
Some of western works has a difficulty distinguishing Twentieth Army from Eleventh Army (Japan) belonging to the same Japanese Sixth Area Army group.

List of Commanders

Commanding officer

Chief of Staff

Notes

References

External links

20
Military units and formations established in 1941
Military units and formations disestablished in 1946
1946 disestablishments in China
1941 establishments in China